The 2019 World Senior Curling Championships was held in Stavanger, Norway from 20 to 27 April 2019. The event was held in conjunction with the 2019 World Mixed Doubles Curling Championship.

Men

Round robin standings
Final round robin standings

*Kim was suspended by the WCF after an incident in their match against Canada in draw 8. He was replaced as skip by Roman Kazimirchik.

Playoffs

Final standings

Women

Round robin standings
Final round robin standings

Playoffs

Final standings

References

External links
Official website

World Senior Curling Championships
International curling competitions hosted by Norway
World Senior Curling
Sport in Stavanger
World Senior Curling
World Senior Curling Championship